Kim Nam-il (Hanja: 金南一; born 14 March 1977) is a South Korean football manager and former player who played as defensive midfielder. He is the manager of K League 1 club Seongnam FC.

Early life 
Kim Nam-il began playing football in third grade of elementary school. His decision to play football was initially met with opposition from his parents because of his impressive academic performance, but he continued his football career during his schooldays.

In the 1996 AFC Youth Championship, he played for South Korean under-20 team, and scored his first international goal against Iran, He wasn't selected as a participant in the 1997 FIFA World Youth Championship, but he was named in South Korean senior team for the 1998 Asian Games by the manager Huh Jung-moo. He made his senior international debut in the tournament.

Playing career 
Under Guus Hiddink, Kim began to play for the national team in earnest. Former unimpressive player in the K League, he was criticized early in his international career due to poor basic skills. However, in Hiddink's belief, he became an irreplaceable defensive midfielder who could block counterattacks of the opponent team beforehand. Nicknamed the "Vacuum cleaner", he showed strong stamina and relentless tussle. In the 2002 World Cup, he appeared all five games until the quarter-finals, but he injured his ankle during the quarter-final match against Spain. South Korea lost to Germany in the semi-finals after he quit the tournament.

The term "Kim Nam-il Syndrome" began to be coined by tabloids to describe Kim's superstardom status. During the 2002 World Cup, he gained an unusually large female fan base, led to sold-out matches and goodies, and caused a sudden increase in popularity of Jeonnam Dragons. Kim, a former unknown to the public, then became highly desirable by numerous endorsement companies that were eager to pay high amounts of money. Many TV programs had asked, or pressured at times for, Kim to appear, but he rejected their offers, and appeared only on interviews instead.

In January 2003, Kim joined an Eredivisie club Feyenoord on loan, and was subleased to the satellite club Excelsior to be tested for five months. However, he didn't make a strong impression.

In the 2006 FIFA World Cup, Kim didn't only contribute to South Korea's defense, but also attack with long-range passes. He also played in the 2010 FIFA World Cup, but he was blamed by some South Korean fans after conceding a penalty kick to Nigeria.

Managerial career 
Kim started his career as a coach at Jiangsu Suning in 2016. He joined the South Korea's coaching staff for the 2018 FIFA World Cup in Russia. After the World Cup, he joined Jeonnam Dragons as a coach.

On 23 December 2019, Kim was appointed as the manager of Seongnam FC.

Personal life
Kim is the youngest of the three brothers in his family, and is a close friend of Lee Kwan-woo and Lee Dong-gook.

Since 2006, there had been rumours about his relationship with anchorwoman Kim Bo-min eventually leading to the possibility of his marriage. The question was raised once again when a netizen posted a picture of a woman who he claimed was Kim Bo-min at Suwon World Cup Stadium. The woman was wearing a hat and a light green scarf that covered about half of her face. Both Kim Bo-min and Kim Nam-il neither confirmed nor denied the allegation. In an interview with a women's magazine, the footballer's parents have stated that they have heard from their son that they are romantically involved, but did not hear about marriage. In June 2007, the couple secretly became engaged and revealed that they had met three years ago. They are married and are having a son.

Career statistics

Club

International

Results list South Korea's goal tally first.

Honours
Jeonnam Dragons
Korean FA Cup runner-up: 2003
Korean League Cup runner-up: 2000+

Suwon Samsung Bluewings
Korean FA Cup runner-up: 2006
Korean League Cup: 2005
Korean Super Cup: 2005
A3 Champions Cup: 2005

Jeonbuk Hyundai Motors
K League 1: 2014

South Korea U20
AFC Youth Championship: 1996

South Korea
FIFA World Cup fourth place : 2002
EAFF Championship: 2008

Individual
CONCACAF Gold Cup Best XI: 2002
K League 1 Best XI: 2003
EAFF Championship Most Valuable Player: 2008

References

External links
 Kim Nam-il – National Team Stats at KFA 
 
 VISSEL KOBE　トップチーム
 National Team Player Record 
 
 

1977 births
Living people
Sportspeople from Incheon
South Korean footballers
Association football midfielders
Hanyang University alumni
Jeonnam Dragons players
Feyenoord players
Excelsior Rotterdam players
Suwon Samsung Bluewings players
Vissel Kobe players
FC Tom Tomsk players
Incheon United FC players
Jeonbuk Hyundai Motors players
Kyoto Sanga FC players
K League 1 players
Eredivisie players
J1 League players
Russian Premier League players
J2 League players
Asian Games competitors for South Korea
South Korea international footballers
Footballers at the 1998 Asian Games
2002 CONCACAF Gold Cup players
2002 FIFA World Cup players
2004 AFC Asian Cup players
2006 FIFA World Cup players
2010 FIFA World Cup players
South Korean expatriate footballers
South Korean expatriate sportspeople in the Netherlands
South Korean expatriate sportspeople in Japan
South Korean expatriate sportspeople in Russia
Expatriate footballers in the Netherlands
Expatriate footballers in Japan
Expatriate footballers in Russia
South Korean football managers
Seongnam FC managers
K League 1 managers